Robert Andrew "Andy" Keith Scott,  (March 16, 1955 – June 24, 2013) was a Liberal Member of Parliament representing the electoral district of Fredericton. He was a member the Cabinet of Canada, most recently serving as the eighteenth Minister of Indian Affairs and Northern Development (2004–2006).

Early life 
Scott was born in 1955 in Fredericton, New Brunswick and grew up in Barker's Point, a working-class neighbourhood. He was the only son in a family of four children. His parents both supported the Liberal Party, with his father especially an avid volunteer. The family business involved making cement blocks and fireplaces for houses. His father also volunteered for a summer camp for disabled children.

Political career
In the late 1980s he was a senior civil servant with the provincial Liberal government of Frank McKenna. He ran for in the 1993 federal election, and won convincingly, becoming the first Liberal MP elected from Fredericton in 40 years.

He was re-elected in the 1997 election and was named Solicitor General of Canada. In 1998, New Democratic Party MP Dick Proctor said he overheard Scott on an airplane talking about several sensitive national matters, including the then-ongoing Vancouver Asia-Pacific Economic Cooperation (APEC) inquiry. Scott was alleged to have stated that several Royal Canadian Mounted Police (RCMP) officers (who had used pepper spray against protesters) would take the blame at the end of it all. He denied prejudging the outcome, but later resigned his post as Solicitor General.

In an incident in the fall of 2003, Scott was hospitalised after being physically assaulted by a constituent angry over his government's support for same sex marriage.

Scott returned to the Cabinet in December 2003, when he was named Minister of State for Infrastructure by  Paul Martin. Following the 2004 federal election he was promoted to the position of Minister of Indian Affairs and Northern Development.

On March 5, 2007, he announced that he would not seek reelection in the 2008 federal election.

After politics
On October 22, 2008 it was announced that Andy Scott would assume a research post in social policy at the University of New Brunswick.

Death
Scott died of cancer on June 24, 2013 at the age of 58, from non-Hodgkin lymphoma.

Electoral history

References

External links

1955 births
2013 deaths
Members of the House of Commons of Canada from New Brunswick
Liberal Party of Canada MPs
Canadian Ministers of Indian Affairs and Northern Development
Members of the King's Privy Council for Canada
Politicians from Fredericton
Deaths from cancer in New Brunswick
Deaths from non-Hodgkin lymphoma
Solicitors General of Canada
Members of the 26th Canadian Ministry
Members of the 27th Canadian Ministry